Rumba Rapids (also known as Rumba RAPids or Oompah Rapids) is a rapids ride at Thorpe Park, Chertsey, Surrey. It opened in 1987 under the name of Thunder River, and is the second oldest ride currently still in service at Thorpe Park. In 2002, it was refurbished and along with other improvements, its name was changed to Ribena Rumba Rapids because of its sponsor, Ribena. In 2006 Ribena's sponsorship contract ended and the ride was named simply Rumba Rapids for the 2007 season. Since the refurbishment in 2002 the ride has become significantly slower.

Ride
The ride starts in the station at the top of a hill. The boats then go around a bend down a hill, it then goes round another bend and into a tunnel. The tunnel sometimes has a waterfall feature on the entrance. The tunnel also features a waterfall feature within the tunnel although the boat does not go through it. The boat then exits the tunnel towards a wave machine with rocks in front of it. In the rare occasion that the occupants of the boat all sit on the side facing the wave machine it is possible to get stuck in between the centre rocks, however this usually requires more than four people. The boat goes under a bridge which is part of the queue line. It goes towards a tower with an oversized shower head attached. This shower head used to drop water on the unsuspecting guests but was removed. The tower currently holds an On Ride Photo camera. The boat then approaches a series of water jets and stops at the lift hill. After a short wait the boat goes up the lift hill back to the station. A staff member guides you out of the boat and you exit going past the On Ride Photo booth. The exit gate features a reptile on a wall squirting water at you.

Accident
In the ride's opening year of 1987 a 7-year-old boy was thrown from a boat and lost an ear.  The news was broken by Children's BBC TV news programme, Newsround.

External links
 

Thorpe Park water rides
Amusement rides introduced in 1987